Make Sure You’re Home for Christmas is a Holiday EP by American R&B singer Joe, released exclusively at Target on October 13, 2009.

The album features 6 songs, including two Joe originals (It Ain't Christmas, Make Sure You're Home). "Make Sure You're Home" was previously recorded with R&B group Profyle featuring Joe and Chico DeBarge, as well as another rendition performed by R&B group Black Coffee featuring Joe.

Track listing
 "God Rest Ye Merry Gentlemen"
 "Have Yourself a Merry Little Christmas"
 "The Christmas Song"
 "Grown Up Christmas List"
 "It Ain't Christmas"
 "Make Sure You're Home"

Charts

Weekly charts

References

Joe (singer) albums
2009 Christmas albums
Christmas albums by American artists
Contemporary R&B Christmas albums